The Arkansas's 7th congressional district was a congressional district for the United States House of Representatives in Arkansas from 1903 to 1953.

The district comprised the following counties: 
 Ashley
 Bradley
 Calhoun
 Chicot
 Clark
 Columbia
 Hempstead
 Lafayette
 Nevada
 Ouachita
 Union.

List of members representing the district

References 
Specific

General
 Election Statistics 1920-present Clerk of the House of Representatives
 
 
 Congressional Biographical Directory of the United States 1774–present

Former congressional districts of the United States
07
1903 establishments in Arkansas
1953 disestablishments in Arkansas